Persicula cordorae is a species of sea snail, a marine gastropod mollusk, in the family Cystiscidae.

References

cordorae
Gastropods described in 1988
Cystiscidae